This is a list of Fort Hays State Tigers football season records. The Fort Hays State Tigers football team is the football team of Fort Hays State University, located in the American city of Hays, Kansas. The team competes as a Mid-America Intercollegiate Athletics Association (MIAA) at the NCAA Division II level.

Since the program's beginning in 1902, they have been known as the West Normals, the Normal Tigers, and the Tigers. Since 1936, Fort Hays State's football team has played in Lewis Field Stadium, named after William Alexander Lewis, president of Fort Hays State University from 1913 to 1933.

Fort Hays has won 12 conference championships: two in the Kansas Conference, five in the Central Intercollegiate Athletic Conference, one in the Central States Intercollegiate Conference, two in the Rocky Mountain Athletic Conference, and two in the Mid-America Intercollegiate Athletics Association.

|- style="background: #000000;"
| colspan="8" style="text-align:center;"| 

|- style="background: #000000;"
| colspan="8" style="text-align:center;"| 

|- style="background: #000000; color: white"
| colspan="8" style="text-align:center;"| Rocky Mountain Athletic Conference

|- style="background: #023E7F;"
| colspan="8" style="text-align:center;"| 

Source:

References

Fort Hays State

Fort Hays State Tigers football seasons